Morong may refer to:

Thomas Morong (1827-1894), botanist
 Morong, Bataan, a municipality in the Philippines
 Morong, Rizal, a municipality in the Philippines
 Morong (district), now a part of the province of Rizal
 Morong, a sub-village of Umalsat, Tehsil Yasin, Ghizer District, Pakistan
 Morong, Guzhang (默戎镇), a town of Guzhang County, Hunan, China.